The Blue-and-Black Movement (SML) is a neo-fascist party in Finland. The party's goal is an independent, vibrant and sovereign Finland, and keeping it as the homeland of the Finns.

The party was born out of row over ethnonationalism in the Finns Party, which led into the Finns Party Youth disintegrating and representatives being expelled from the party. The party's name and colors have been inspired by the Patriotic People's Movement. As of 14 April 2022, the party has received the 5,000 signatures to register the party.

The party plans to run in the 2023 Finnish parliamentary election.

Policies 
The party considers itself radical and traditionalist.

The party wants to increase awareness of the cultural roots of the Finns by for example, having the educational system teach about Finnish paganism along with Christianity. The party also wants Finnish to be the only official language in Finland.

Criticism 
According to Oula Silvennoinen, a historian known for his work on Finnish co-operation with the Germans during World War Two, the party's ideology is neo-fascist.

The Ministry of Justice considered the party program so radical and anti-democratic it had to be partially rewritten to be accepted for registration. For example, the party wanted an ethnic register of people living in Finland, to outlaw advocating for a non-traditional family, and to reconsider the citizenship of everyone made a citizen after 1990.

The party immediately caused controversy when chairman Kuru wrote that the Movement opposes visible presence of non-Christian religions and that interests and genetics of the Jews are separate and "in total conflict with those of the European native population". The comments were condemned by chairman of the Helsinki Jewish Congregation Yaron Nadbornik.

Election results

Parliamentary elections

References 

Nationalist parties in Finland
Far-right politics in Finland
Political parties established in 2021
2021 establishments in Finland
Neo-fascist parties
Finns Party breakaway groups